Commander Mars may refer to:

 Mars (マーズ Māzu), a commander from Team Galactic in Pokémon, see List of Pokémon characters#Team Galactic
 Alastair Mars (1915–1985) Lieutenant Commander in the British Royal Navy, a World War II submarine commander

See also
 Mars (surname)
 Mars (disambiguation)